Route 70 is a  state highway in the U.S. state of Connecticut, connecting the towns of  Cheshire and Meriden. The western half of the route is an important link between the Greater New Haven and the Greater Waterbury areas and is part of the state primary highway system. It runs in a “U” Shaped Pattern.

Route description

Route 70 officially begins as a continuation of SSR 801, known locally as Waterbury Road and East Main Street, near its interchange with Interstate 84 (I-84) at exit 26 in Cheshire. Routes 68 and 70 become concurrent as they proceed east along West Main Street and Main Street into Cheshire center. After a brief (0.15 mi) three-way overlap with Route 10, Routes 68 and 70 continue eastward together as Academy Road for another . Route 68 then splits off to the east towards Wallingford while Route 70 heads northeast towards Meriden (as South Meriden Road). Route 70 enters the city of Meriden, where the road name changes to River Road. Route 70 follows River Road for about  then turns onto Main Street. After crossing the Quinnipiac River, Route 70 turns southeast onto Hanover Avenue, ending after another  at Route 71. Route 70 carries average traffic volumes of about 15,400 vehicles per day west of Route 10 and about 6,300 vehicles per day east of Route 10.

History
The route directly connecting downtown Waterbury and Cheshire center was first improved in 1852 by the Waterbury and Cheshire Plank Road Company, which had built the toll road. The company continued operating the toll road until 1880 when the company charter was repealed by the Connecticut General Assembly. In 1922, the Waterbury to Cheshire road was designated as a secondary state highway known as Highway 323. Highway 323 began at the intersection of Meriden Road and East Main Street and followed East Main Street towards Cheshire. In Cheshire, Highway 323 followed modern Route 70 until the junction with Highland Avenue (modern Route 10). In the 1932 state highway renumbering, modern Route 70 was created from old Highway 323 plus an extension east of Route 10 along a previously unnumbered road to the South Meriden section of the city of Meriden. The original eastern terminus was at Hanover Road (then Route 71) just after crossing the Quinnipiac River. The route was extended by 1955 along New Hanover Avenue to Old Colony Road (then US 5A). In 1962, Route 70 took over the former south end of Route 71 (Hanover Avenue) to its modern terminus at Old Colony Road (modern Route 71) after Route 71 was relocated to the former US 5A. In 1964, Route 70 was truncated in the west so that it now began at the I-84 Interchange 26 westbound onramp. The former Route 70 in Waterbury was redesignated as unsigned State Road 801.

Junction list

References

External links

070
Transportation in New Haven County, Connecticut
Cheshire, Connecticut
Meriden, Connecticut